Euchromia horsfieldi is a species of moth in the subfamily Arctiinae first described by Frederic Moore in 1859. It is found on Java, Sumatra, Borneo, the Lesser Sunda Islands and Christmas Island.

The wingspan is 42–44 mm. The abdomen has two pale yellow rings with two blue ones between and distal to them. The basal transparent area of the hindwing is partly white.

The larvae feed on Dioscorea species. They are a dull reddish and have a black head.

References

Moths described in 1858
Euchromiina